Five referendums were held in Switzerland during 1956. The first was held on 4 March on a federal resolution on a limited extension of price controls, and was approved by voters. The second and third were held on 13 May on a popular initiative "on the grant of concessions for water usage" and a federal resolution on government efforts to strengthen the economy of Graubünden, both of which were rejected by voters. The fourth and fifth were held on 30 September on a federal resolution on changing the breadstuffs law and a petition about decisions on expenditure taken by the Federal Assembly, both of which were also rejected.

Results

March: Price controls

May: Water usage

May: Measures to strengthen the economy of Graubünden

September: Breadstuffs

September: Federal Assembly expenditure

References

Switzerland
Referendums
Referendums in Switzerland